The 1892–93 British Home Championship was an international football tournament between the British Home Nations. The competition was won and dominated by England, who beat all three rival teams and scored 17 goals in just three matches. Fred Spiksley claimed four and Walter Gilliat scored a hat-trick in the competition's opening game. Scotland came second with victories over Ireland and Wales, who finished third and fourth respectively.

England began as the strongest team, scoring twelve goals in the first two games against the Irish and the Welsh with only one in reply. Scotland too began well, winning their match against Wales in Wales by 8–0 before netting another six in a rout of Ireland at home. In the final games, England and Scotland played a match in London which England easily won 5–2 to whitewash their opponents and take the trophy. In a consolation game in Belfast, Ireland beat Wales 4–3 to finish third.

The official attendance for the England v. Scotland match was 16,000; the crowd was so large that it was forced to stand in front of the journalists who were therefore prevented from seeing all of the action. Consequently, there is some dispute over the goal-scorers: although it is not credited in any of the official references, it is now generally accepted that Spiksley scored a hat-trick.

Table

Results

Winning squad

References

Bibliography

British
Home
Home
Home
British Home Championships
Brit
Brit